Lauener is a surname. Notable people with the surname include:

Kuno Lauener
Henri Lauener (1933–2002), Swiss philosopher

See also
Launer